The New College is an institution of higher education in Chennai, Tamil Nadu. Established in 1951, the institution is one of the affiliated colleges of the University of Madras, with autonomous status. The college was established by the Muslim Educational Association of Southern India (MEASI) to meet the educational requirements of the Muslim students in South India. The maximum 90% of strength in college is Muslim students.

Location

The college is located in the Center of Chennai on a  campus. It is one of the few colleges in Chennai located within the city hub. The older buildings are notable for their Indo-Saracenic architecture which stand in contrast to the new educational blocks. The older buildings are being renovated. The same campus also houses New College Institute Of Management, MEASI Academy Of Architecture And Institute Of Research In Soil Biology and Bio-Technology, MEASI Institute Of Information Technology And MEASI CA Academy.

The New College was founded on 2 July 1951 by the Muslim Educational Association of Southern India (MEASI), the college is an institution of higher education offering instruction in more than twenty courses in humanities, science and commerce at undergraduate level and more than twelve courses at postgraduate level. Though primarily established for providing higher education to Muslim students, its doors are open to students from all communities. Deeniyath classes for Muslim students and moral instruction classes for others, are conducted during working hours. Working hours are 08.30 am to 01.30 pm for shift I and 02.15 pm to 06.40 pm for shift II

Courses

The college offers 23 Courses In Humanities, Sciences And Commerce At The Undergraduate Level And 10 Courses At The Postgraduate Level.
Shift I (08:30 AM To 01:30 PM)
Undergraduate - Aided

B.A. Arabic
B.A. Economics
B.A. English
B.A. History
B.A. Sociology
B.Sc. Mathematics
B.Sc. Physics
B.Sc. Chemistry
B.Sc. Plant Biology & Plant Biotechnology
B.Sc. Advanced Zoology & Biotechnology
B.Com. General
B.Com. Corporate Secretaryship

Undergraduate - Self-Financing
B.Sc. Computer Science

Postgraduate - Aided

M.A. Arabic
M.A. Tamil
M.A. English
M.Sc. Chemistry
M.Sc. Zoology
M.Com.

Research Courses
Part Time
M.Phil. / Ph.D. Arabic
M.Phil. / Ph.D. Tamil
M.Phil. / Ph.D. Chemistry
Ph.D. English
Ph.D. Economics
Ph.D. Zoology
Ph.D. Physics
Ph.D. Commerce

Full Time
M.Phil. English
M.Phil. / Ph.D. Tamil
M.Phil. / Ph.D. Arabic
M.Phil. / Ph.D. Economics
M.Phil. / Ph.D. Chemistry
M.Phil. / Ph.D. Zoology
M.Phil. / Ph.D. Commerce

Shift II (02:00PM To 06:25 PM)
Undergraduate - Self Financing

B.Sc. Information Technology
B.A. Urdu
B.Sc. Biotechnology
B.Sc. Computer Science
B.B.A.
B.C.A.
B.Com. General
B.Com. Corporate Secretaryship
B.Com. Bank Management
B.Com. Information Systems Management

Postgraduate - Self-Financing
M.A. History
M.Sc. Computer Science
M.Sc. Physics
M.Sc. Mathematics
M.Sc. Botany
M.Com. Corporate Secretaryship

Extracurricular
Student volunteer organisations include the National Cadet Corps, the National Service Scheme, Red Cross Youth and a Rotaract club. A special and unique corporate social responsibility club is running exclusively and successfully by students of B.Com. Corporate Secretaryship by funding among the students

The NCC has two divisions in the college - the Armoured Squadron and the Battalion.

Armoured
In "1 TN Armd Sqn NCC" students see and drive armoured tanks, and learn about rifles. The squadron is led by Captain. M. Anees Ahmed, a senior professor in the Department of Physics.

Battalion
"2 Company 1 Tamil Nadu Battalion NCC" deals with rifles. The cadets learn rifles and signals. The battalion is led by  H. Zahid Hussain who is a senior professor in the Economics Department. Every year he creates 160 cadets.

Campus culture
The campus is cosmopolitan with students from India and abroad, especially from Islamic nations such as Saudi Arabia, Oman, Sudan, Malaysia and Bangladesh.

The college represents numerous sports activities all over the city. The college conducts elections to select Students Chairman and General Secretary.

MEASI Institute of Management
In 1987, the Muslim Educational Association of Southern India established the MEASI Institute of Management to give training in management with emphasis on practical application suited to Indian environmental and management requirements. It is one of the few institutions in South India that offered an MBA Programme in 1987.
The IM is managed by a board of trustees consisting of:
 M. Mohammed Hashim, Chairman
 H. M. Shamsudeen, Executive Director
 A. Mohamed Ashraf, Finance Director
 M. Avais Musvee, Member
 M. Mohamed Shameem, Member
 Abdul Jabbar Suhail, Member
 K. Shahid Mansoor,  Member
 Irsad Ahmed Mecca, Member
 M. Mohamed Hashim, Invitee
 U. Mohamed Khalilullah, Invitee
 A. K. Abdulla, Invitee
 Noman H. Millwala, Invitee
 C. Abdul Malick, Invitee
 Imtiaz Ahamed, Invitee
 Dr. Major Zahid Husain, Ex Officio Member
 N. Balasubramanian, Director

MEASI IM has air-conditioned classrooms, a boardroom, staff rooms, offices, and a mini-auditorium. The course offered is M.B.A (full-time and part-time). It is approved by AICTE, affiliated to the University of Madras, accredited by the National Board of Accreditation, and ISO 9001-2000 certified.

MEASI IM has produced gold medals and ranks both in the full-time and part-time MBA programs. It has produced 100% results almost every year. Students of the institute have taken part in inter-collegiate management meets conducted by business-schools and have brought laurels. More than 75% of the students have been placed in companies through the placement cell of the institute, every year.
MEASI Institute of Management was ranked consistently in various magazines such as Times of India, India today's best business school, Careers 360, Silicon India, Outlook India and Dun & Bradstreet B school surveys.

MEASI Institute of Information Technology
MEASI Institute Of Information Technology is an independent institute in Chennai, offering an MCA programme. It was founded in 2002 by the Muslim Educational Association of Southern India (MEASI). The association was registered under the societies act XXI of 1860.

The MEASI ITT was established to run postgraduate courses in computer science and information technology, and approved by the All India Council for Technical Education (AICTE), New Delhi and affiliated to the University of Madras, Chennai.

MEASI Academy of Architecture
MEASI Academy of Architecture was established in 1999 by the Muslim Educational Association of Southern India (MEASI). MEASI AA is located in the heart of city, inside the New college campus. It consists of studios and classrooms.

The Board of Trustees is:
 Chairman - K. Ameenur Rahman
 Hon. Secretary - H. M. Shamsudeen
 Hon. Treasurer - A. Mohammed Ashraf
 Trustees - A. Mohamed Haris
 T. P. Imbichammad
 S. Ziaudeen Ahmed
 H. C. Abdul Azeez
Courses are five year B.Arch, five year B.Arch (Interior Design), and two year postgraduate M.Arch (Real Estate Development).

The course is headed by Prof. N. Altaf Ahmed. It is accredited by the National Board of Accreditation and ISO 9001-2000 certified.

The Alumni Association of MEASI Academy of Architecture was formed with ten batches of Alumnus on 13 September 2013, supporting the growth and development of the institution.

New College Managing Committee
 Chairman - Nawab Mohammed Ali Azimjah,
 Honorary Secretary and Correspondent - Janab Elias Sait
Treasurer
Janab.Najmuddin
Members
 Janab 
 Janab Alhaj
 M. Mohamed Hasim
 S. M. Hamid
 Makkal Pavalar Inkulab (orator and revolutionary Tamil writer).

Notable alumni

 C. S. Karnan, former judge
 Woorkeri Raman, cricketer
 K. R. Periyakaruppan, former Minister for Tamil Nadu Hindu Religious and Charitable Endowments
 G. K. Vasan, Indian politician
 Radha Ravi, actor of Tamil cinema, politician
 Sarath Kumar, actor of Tamil cinema, politician
 Karthik, actor of Tamil cinema
 Jaishankar, Tamil actor
 Vineeth, actor of Tamil and Malayalam cinema
 Nagendra Prasad, film actor
 Chinni Jayanth, comedian of Tamil cinema, mimicry artist
 M. S. Guhan, film producer
 T. R. Baalu, former Central Shipping Minister
 Bharath, Tamil cinema actor
 Veera Bahu, Tamil Cinema Actor
 Prasanna Pandian
 Shiva Rajkumar, Kannada actor
 Puneeth Rajkumar, Kannada actor
 Nelson Dilipkumar, film director

References

External links
New College

Educational institutions established in 1940
Arts and Science colleges in Chennai
The New College, Chennai
1940 establishments in India